Boy Swallows Universe is an upcoming Australian coming of age television limited series for Netflix based on the semi-autobiographical novel of the same name by Trent Dalton. Written by John Collee, the story revolves around Eli Bell, a young working-class boy who enters Brisbane's underground world in order to save his mother's life from danger.

Cast 
 Travis Fimmel as Lyle Orlik
 Simon Baker as Robert Bell
 Phoebe Tonkin as Frances Bell
 Felix Cameron as Eli Bell
 Lee Tiger Halley as Gus Bell
 Bryan Brown as Slim Halliday
 Anthony La Paglia as Tytus Broz
 Sophie Wilde as Caitlyn Spies
 Christopher James Baker as Ivan Kroll
 HaiHa Le as Bich Dang
Isaac Strutt-Stevens as Christopher 
 Deborah Mailman as Poppy Birkbeck
 Ben O’Toole as Teddy
 Zachary Wan as Darren Dang
 Millie Donaldson as Shelley Huffman (17 years old)
 Eloise Rothfield as Shelley Huffman (13 years old)
 Drew Matthews as Titch
 Matthew Knight as prison guard of Boggo Rd jail.

Production

Development 
The television adaptation rights of Boy Swallows Universe was acquired by Anonymous Content, Chapter One, and Hopscotch Features where Australian actor and director Joel Edgerton is set to direct. On 4 March 2022, it was announced that an 8-episode limited series had been commissioned by Netflix, with Edgerton remained as executive producer. Joining Edgerton, couple of executive producers are revealed to be Troy Lum and Andrew Mason of Brouhaha Entertainment, Sophie Gardiner of Chapter One, and Kerry Kohansky-Roberts and Toby Bentley of Anonymous Content.

Casting 
It was revealed on 31 August 2022 that Felix Cameron would be playing the leading character, Eli Bell. It was also revealed that Lee Tiger Halley, Travis Fimmel, Simon Baker, Phoebe Tonkin, Bryan Brown, Anthony La Paglia, and Sophie Wilde joined the main ensemble of the series. In addition, Christopher James Baker, HaiHa Le, Deborah Mailman, Ben O'Toole, Zachary Wan, Millie Donaldson, Eloise Rothfield, and Drew Matthews have also landed roles.

Filming 
On 31 August 2022, it was revealed that Shelly Farthing-Dawe would be working as the main cinematographer of the series. Principal photography for the series reportedly began in August 2022, with filming began in Brisbane.

References

External links 
 

Australian television miniseries
Coming-of-age television shows
English-language Netflix original programming
Mass media portrayals of the working class
Upcoming Netflix original programming
Television series based on books
Television series based on novels
Television series by Anonymous Content